Mariano Armellini (7 February 1852 – 24 February 1896) was an Italian archaeologist and historian. Born in Rome, he was one of the founders of the Pontifical Academy of Martyrs.

He is the author of Gli antichi cimiteri cristiani di Roma e d'Italia (The Ancient Christian Cemeteries of Rome and Italy) and  Le catacombe romane (The Roman Catacombs), but became famous chiefly for Le chiese di Roma dal secolo IV al XIX (The Churches of Rome from the 4th to the 19th Centuries), a major work in which he recorded many of the city's churches, including those no longer extant.

External links
Le chiese di Roma dal secolo IV al XIX (on LacusCurtius)

1852 births
1896 deaths
Archaeologists from Rome
Pontifical Academy of Martyrs